Kush Kush, stylized as KUSH KUSH, is a DJ and producer duo, which has gained international recognition mainly through modern reinterpretations of well-known classics. Little is known about the members themselves. Neither their names nor their faces are publicly revealed, as they only show themselves hidden behind rabbit masks.

Their most successful release yet is called "Fight Back with Love Tonight", which samples White Town's hit single "Your Woman" from 1997. Kush Kush's electronic reinterpretation of the song was especially popular in Russia, where it stayed in the Airplay Charts for 10 weeks, peaking on #1 and also climbed the Shazam-Charts to #2. The single was presented with a Platinum-Award in fall 2018. As a result of the success of "Fight Back with Love Tonight", Kush Kush played at international festivals such as Alfa Future People Festival in Bolshoye Kozino and Europa Plus TV's Hit Non Stop Festival in Sochi.

Shortly after, Kush Kush entered the Russian radio charts again, peaking at #59 with their 2019 released song "SloMo". Most recently the duo released its single "I'm Blue" based on the 90's global Eurodance-hit Blue (Da Ba Dee) by Eiffel 65.

Discography 

Up until now Kush Kush released individual singles rather than full-length albums. Their releases can be identified easily as an image of a rabbit head can be found on each of their artworks.

References

External links 

Official website

German DJs
German record producers
Electronic dance music DJs